San Stino di Livenza (Venetian: San Stin) is a town in the Metropolitan City of Venice, Veneto, northern Italy. It is connected by the SP61 provincial road and by the motorway A4. The main square (piazza) is the Piazza Aldo Moro.

Geography
The town lies between the Livenza river and the Malgher canal.

Transportation
 Santo Stino di Livenza railway station

Sources

(Google Maps)